The Georgia Department of Agriculture is the oldest state department of agriculture in the United States of America.

Summary 
In 1874, the Georgia Department of Agriculture was established. The department regulates food, fiber, and the agricultural workforce in the state.  It also works to promote and protect agriculture.

List of commissioners 
This is a list of Georgia Commissioner of Agriculture.
 1935-1937 and 1941-1954 Thomas Mercer "Tom" Linder<Jeff Davis Ledger, Hazlehurst, GA>
 1954-1969 Phil Campbell
 1969-2011 Tommy Irvin
 2011-2023 Gary Black
 2023-present Tyler Harper

References

External links
 Georgia Department of Agriculture
 First Commissioner of Agriculture historical marker

Agriculture in Georgia (U.S. state)

State departments of agriculture of the United States
Agriculture
1874 establishments in Georgia (U.S. state)